Events in the year 1902 in Spain.

Incumbents
Monarch: Alfonso XIII
Prime Minister - Práxedes Mateo Sagasta (until 10 December), Francisco Silvela Le Vielleuze (starting 10 December)

Births

April 4 - José María Albareda. (died 1966)

References

 
Years of the 20th century in Spain
1900s in Spain
Spain
Spain